

Season summary
Sevilla came on fifth place in the domestic league with 68 points in total. Fourth-placed Osasuna also got 68 points, but won one more game. In the Copa del Rey, the team lost in the round of 16 against Cádiz. In the UEFA Cup, the team won their first ever European tournament by defeating Middlesbrough by 4–0 in the final.

Summer transfers

In

Winter transfers

In

First-team squad
Squad at end of season

La Liga

League table

2006 UEFA Cup Final

External links
Official Sevilla FC website
EUFO

Sevilla FC seasons
Sevilla
UEFA Europa League-winning seasons